Frederick van Sierck (died 20 July 1322) was a bishop of Utrecht, in the present day Netherlands, from 1317 to 1322.

Frederick van Sierck was the protégé of William III, Count of Holland, who had managed to get him elected to the bishopric of Utrecht. This way the count was able to increase his influence in the bishopric, which led to friction between the nobility of Utrecht and the provost Floris van Jutphaas, who wanted to make an end to Hollandic influence. Floris won a trial over the definition of the jurisdiction between the bishop and the provost.

The construction of the Dom Tower of Utrecht began during Frederick's episcopate. The theory that the bishop wanted a strong defendable tower where he would be able to retreat in times of danger, is not universally accepted.

Frederick van Sierck was buried in a chapel named after him in the Dom Church.

Prince-Bishops of Utrecht
1322 deaths
Burials at St. Martin's Cathedral, Utrecht
14th-century Roman Catholic bishops in the Holy Roman Empire
Year of birth unknown